The Men's Individual Pursuit C4 track cycling event at the 2012 Summer Paralympics took place on 1 September at London Velopark. The race distance was 4 km.

Preliminaries
Q = Qualifier
WR = World Record

Finals 
Gold medal match

Bronze medal match

References

Men's pursuit C4